Johnny Cooper may refer to:

 John Cooper Clarke (born 1949), English performance artist
 Jonny Cooper, Gaelic footballer
 Johnny Cooper (Home and Away), a character in the Australian television series Home and Away
 Johnny Tahu Cooper (born 1929), a.k.a. The Maori Cowboy, New Zealand rock n' roll musician

See also
John Cooper (disambiguation)
Jack Cooper (disambiguation)
Jon Cooper (disambiguation)